Tsuneo Ando is an 9th dan Yoshinkan Aikido teacher.  He spent 13 years as uchi deshi to Gozo Shioda, the founder of Yoshinkan Aikido.  He is said to closely resemble Shioda in terms of size; speed and style. Tsuneo Ando was born in 1956 in Nihama City, Ehime Prefecture on the island of Shikoku. He attended Tokushima University where he studied engineering. Ando joined the Tokushima University Aikido Club where he reached the rank of 2nd dan in aikikai.  After graduating from university Ando was briefly employed by a chemical company.  In 1981, he joined the Yoshinkai as uchi deshi.  He was awarded the title of shihan (Master) in 1993 and he currently holds the rank of 8th dan in Yoshinkan Aikido.  He also holds the title of shuseki shihan (主席師範, chairman shihan)  at the Yoshinkan Aikido Headquarters in Tokyo.

Publications
Ando has produced several DVDs for aikido training.
Aikido for Beginners DVD
合気道達人列伝 安藤毎夫 DVD 2000. 
Aikido no Akashi DVD
Aikido Tatsujin Retsuden DVD
Dekiru Aikido DVD
Ukemi DVD
 The Special Series Volume 1; Volume 2 and Volume 3.
 Buki waza DVD 
 Aiki Jo DVD 
 A range of DVDs designed for test preparation and covering the Yoshinkan Aikido test syllabus from kids beginners all the way up to yudan.
 Instructors Test Syllabus DVD

He has also published two books Chushin Ryoku no Jidai ('The Age of Center Power') and Aikido no Kai ('Aikido Answers').  Chushin Ryoku no Jidai is available in Japanese (published by BAB Japan) and in German (published by Bill Verlag).  Aikido no Kai is currently only available in Japanese.

Personal life
Ando lives in Chiba Prefecture with his wife, South African Stephanie Ando (4th dan), and their two sons.  He has two children from his first marriage to Naomi Ando, also a student of Gozo Shioda, who died in 1997.

References

External links
Yoshinkan Aikido Ryu
daiwagou (Tsuneo Ando on Twitter)
Yoshinkan Aikido Ryu  YouTube channel
Talking to Tsuneo Ando Part 1 – the Gozo Shioda that Nobody Knew
Talking to Tsuneo Ando Part 2 – Aikido and World Peace

1956 births
Living people
Japanese aikidoka
Sportspeople from Ehime Prefecture
Tokushima University alumni
Shihan